Spain is scheduled to compete at the 2017 World Aquatics Championships in Budapest, Hungary from 14 July to 30 July.

Medalists

Diving

Spain has entered 3 divers (three male).

Men

Open water swimming

Spain has entered three open water swimmers

Swimming

Spanish swimmers have achieved qualifying standards in the following events (up to a maximum of 2 swimmers in each event at the A-standard entry time, and 1 at the B-standard):

Men

Women

Synchronized swimming

Spain's synchronized swimming team consisted of 13 athletes (1 male and 12 female).

Women

Mixed

 Legend: (R) = Reserve Athlete

Water polo

Spain qualified both a men's and women's teams.

Men's tournament

Team roster

Daniel López Pinedo
Alberto Munarriz Egaña
Álvaro Granados Ortega
Miguel del Toro
Alejandro Bustos Sánchez
Marc Minguell Alférez (C)
Alberto Barroso Macarro
Albert Español Lifante
Roger Tahull Compte
Francisco Fernández Miranda
Blai Mallarach Güell
Víctor Gutiérrez Santiago
José Motos Martín

Group play

Playoffs

9th–12th place semifinals

Ninth place game

Women's tournament

Team roster

Laura Ester Ramos
Marta Bach Pascual
Anna Espar Llaquet
Beatriz Ortiz Muñoz
Matilde Ortiz Reyes
Helena Lloret Gómez
Clara Espar Llaquet
María del Pilar Peña Carrasco (C)
Judith Forca Ariza
Paula Crespí Barriga
Anna Gual Rovirosa
Paula Leitón Arrones
Sandra Domene Pérez

Group play

Playoffs

Quarterfinals

Semifinals

Final

References

Nations at the 2017 World Aquatics Championships
Spain at the World Aquatics Championships
2017 in Spanish sport